Ashraful Abedin is a Jatiya Party (Ershad) politician and the former Member of Parliament of Jhenaidah-2.

Career
Abedin was elected to parliament from Jhenaidah-2 as a Jatiya Party candidate in 1988.

References

Living people
4th Jatiya Sangsad members
Year of birth missing (living people)
Jatiya Party (Ershad) politicians